The Réunion harrier or Réunion marsh harrier (Circus maillardi) is a bird of prey belonging to the marsh harrier group of harriers. It is now found only on the Indian Ocean island of Réunion, although fossil material from Mauritius has been referred to this species. It is known locally as the papangue or pied jaune. The Malagasy harrier (C. macrosceles) of Madagascar and the Comoro Islands was previously treated as a subspecies of this bird but is increasingly regarded as a separate species. The Réunion harrier appears to be declining in numbers and it is classed as an endangered species.

Description

It is about 42–55 cm long; the female is around 3–15% larger than the male. The male has a blackish head and back with white streaks. The underparts, underwings and rump are white and the tail is grey. The wings are grey and black with a white leading edge. Females and immatures are dark brown with a white rump and barred tail.

The birds are mostly silent except during the breeding season when they give a chattering threat call, a wailing courtship call and chuckling food-associated calls.

The Malagasy harrier is larger and paler with longer wings and legs.

Ecology
It is typically found in forested upland areas between 300 and 700 m above sea-level. It also visits cane fields and grassland. Today its diet includes many introduced mammals (rats, mice and tenrecs) but it originally fed mainly on birds and insects. It will also take small lizards, frogs and carrion. It has a number of adaptations which are unusual among harriers: broad rounded wings for hunting between trees and a short tarsus and long claws, which are common among those birds of prey which feed on other birds. It breeds between January and May and lays two or three white eggs in a nest on the ground.

Status and conservation
In 2011 it had an estimated population of at least 564 birds including about 150 breeding pairs. It has been evaluated as endangered by BirdLife International and it is threatened by destruction and disturbance of its habitat and by poaching, deliberate persecution and accidental poisoning by rodenticides. It became a protected species in 1966 and its numbers were thought to be stable or increasing until 2000–2010 when its population appeared to decrease.

Sites identified by BirdLife International as being important for the conservation of the species are the Important Bird Areas (IBAs) of:
 Mouth of the Cirque de Salazie
 Ravine de la Grande Chaloupe
 Rivière des Marsouins – Grand Étang
 Rivière des Remparts - Rivière Langevin

Taxonomy
 
The species was described in 1862 by Jules Verreaux. He named it in honour of Louis Maillard, a French botanist and engineer who mentioned the bird in a book about the island.

In 1893 Alfred Newton and Hans Gadow described tarsometatarsi, tibiae and metacarpals from a hawk called Astur alphonsi (later renamed Accipiter alphonsi and Circus alphonsi) from Mauritius. In 1958 James Greenway considered this taxon as conspecific with the pied harrier. A later examination of the bones came to the conclusion that Astur alphonsi is actually identical with Circus maillardi, which formerly occurred on Mauritius too but is now extirpated.

References

Birds described in 1862
Birds of Mauritius
Birds of Réunion
Harriers (birds)